Alchemilla sprucei, synonym Lachemilla sprucei, is a species of plant in the family Rosaceae. It is native to south-west Colombia and Ecuador. It was first described in 1929 by Lily May Perry.

Conservation
Under the synonym Lachemilla sprucei, Alchemilla sprucei was assessed as "vulnerable" in the 2004 IUCN Red List, where it is said to be native only to Ecuador. , Plants of the World Online also included Colombia in the distribution of A. sprucei .

References

sprucei
Flora of Colombia
Flora of Ecuador
Plants described in 1929
Taxonomy articles created by Polbot